The discography of Four Year Strong, an American rock band, consists of seven studio albums, one compilation album, five extended plays and eight singles.

Albums

Studio albums

Compilation albums

Extended plays

Singles

Other appearances

Music videos

References
Footnotes

Citations

Discographies of American artists
Pop punk group discographies